Kinesin-like protein KIF2C is a protein that in humans is encoded by the KIF2C gene.

The protein encoded by this gene is a member of kinesin-like protein family. Most proteins of this family are microtubule-dependent molecular motors that transport organelles within cells and move chromosomes during cell division. This protein acts to regulate microtubule dynamics in cells and is important for anaphase chromosome segregation and may be required to coordinate the onset of sister centromere separation.

References

Further reading

External links 
 

Human genes
Human proteins